Tendrement is the second album by French pop singer Lorie. It originally came out on 16 September 2002 in a regular jewel case version and a limited edition cardboard box containing the CD in a digipak and eight postcards featuring the famous blond singer. On 2 December 2002, a limited Christmas edition of the album was released, in digipak form, with extra tracks and a DVD... but no more postcards. Finally, on 2 June 2003, the regular jewel case was re-released to include the hit single "Sur un air latino". As of 20 September 2004, this version can be bought jointly with the singer's debut album, Près de Toi.

Track listing

Original version

 "Intro" — 0'30
 "J'ai besoin d'amour" — 3'38
 "Fan'2 toi" — 4'38
 "Pour que tu me reviennes" — 4'01
 "Tendrement" — 3'54
 "Ton sourire" — 3'41
 "Dans mes rêves" — 3'57
 "Dis-moi" — 3'43
 "À 20 ans" — 3'20
 "Je t'aime maman" — 3'58
 "Laisse faire le fun" (featuring 4 You) — 4'02

Christmas limited edition

CD

 "Intro" — 0'30
 "J'ai besoin d'amour" — 3'38
 "Fan'2 toi" — 4'38
 "Pour que tu me reviennes" — 4'01
 "Tendrement" — 3'54
 "Ton sourire" — 3'41
 "Dans mes rêves" — 3'57
 "Dis-moi" — 3'43
 "À 20 ans" — 3'20
 "Je t'aime maman" — 3'58
 "Laisse faire le fun" (featuring 4 You) — 4'02
 "When I Think About You" — 3'48
 "J'ai besoin d'amour (version acoustique)" — 3'08

DVD

 "Près de moi" — 3'43 (music video and karaoke video)
 "Je serai (ta meilleure amie)" — 3'28 (music video and karaoke video)
 "Toute seule" — 3'28 (music video and karaoke video)
 "J'ai besoin d'amour" — 3'40 (music video and karaoke video)

New regular version

 "Intro" — 0'30
 "Sur un air latino" — 3'31
 "J'ai besoin d'amour" — 3'38
 "Fan'2 toi" — 4'38
 "Pour que tu me reviennes" — 4'01
 "Tendrement" — 3'54
 "Ton sourire" — 3'41
 "Dans mes rêves" — 3'57
 "Dis-moi" — 3'43
 "À 20 ans" — 3'20
 "Je t'aime maman" — 3'58
 "Laisse faire le fun" (featuring 4 You) — 4'02

Charts

Weekly charts

Year-end charts

Certifications

References

Lorie (singer) albums
2002 albums
Sony Music France albums